Bellini is a crater on Mercury.  Its name was adopted by the International Astronomical Union (IAU) in 2019, and is named for the Italian painter Giovanni Bellini.

Bellini lies near the center of the large Rembrandt basin.

References

Impact craters on Mercury